The 1985 Women's 7-Up World Open Squash Championship was the women's edition of the 1985 World Open, which serves as the individual world championship for squash players. The event took place in Dublin in Ireland during August 1985. Susan Devoy won the World Open title, defeating Lisa Opie in the final.

Seeds

Draw and results

Notes
Susan Devoy won her first World Open and would go on to win four in total.

See also
World Open
1985 Men's World Open Squash Championship

References

External links
Women's World Open

World Squash Championships
1985 in squash
Squash
1970s in Dublin (city)
Squash tournaments in Ireland
Squash
1985 in women's squash
International sports competitions hosted by Ireland